Jan Provoost, or Jean Provost, or Jan Provost (1462/65 – January 1529) was a Belgian painter born in Mons.

Provost was a prolific master who left his early workshop in Valenciennes to run two workshops, one in Bruges, where he was made a burgher in 1494, the other simultaneously in Antwerp, which was the economic centre of the Low Countries. Provost was also a cartographer, engineer, and architect. He met Albrecht Dürer in Antwerp in 1520, and a Dürer portrait drawing at the National Gallery, London, is conjectured to be of Provost. He married the widow of the miniaturist and painter Simon Marmion, after whose death he inherited the considerable Marmion estate. He died in Bruges, in January 1529.

The styles of Gerard David and Hans Memling can be detected in Provoost's religious paintings. The Last Judgement painted for the Bruges town hall in 1525 is the only painting for which documentary evidence identifies Provost. Surprising discoveries can still be made: in 1971 an unknown and anonymous panoramic Crucifixion from the village church at Koolkerke was identified as Provost's. It is on permanent loan to the Groeningemuseum, Bruges, which has several works of Provost. A retrospective exhibition took place in 2008–2009.

Selected works

Crucifixion c. 1495 Metropolitan Museum of Art
Crucifixion c. 1500 Groeningemuseum, Bruges
The Virgin in Glory, c. 1524 Hermitage Museum
The Last Judgment Detroit Institute of Arts
Nursing Madonna (Madonna Lactans), ca. 1500–1510, Musée des Beaux-Arts, Strasbourg
Virgin and Child, attributed, National Gallery, London
Last Judgment for the Bruges town hall, 1525 Groeningemuseum, Bruges
 The Miser and Death, Groeningemuseum, Bruges
 Donor with St Nicholas and his Wife with St Godelina, Groeningemuseum, Bruges
Carrying of the Cross (diptych with the enigmatic picture on the reverse side), c. 1522 Old St. John's Hospital, Bruges
Saint John the Baptist and a Canon, Musée des Beaux-Arts, Valenciennes
Triptych of the Parish Church of Calheta, Museu de Arte Sacra do Funchal
Saint Mary Magdalene, Museu de Arte Sacra do Funchal
Nossa Senhora da Misericórdia Triptych, Museu Nacional de Arte Antiga
The Annunciation, attributed, Queensland Gallery of Modern Art
Zechariah, Prado Museum, Madrid.
The Virgin and Child, Prado Museum, Madrid.
Portrait of a Female Donor, Thyssen-Bornemisza Museum, Madrid.

Further reading
 Ron Spronk. Jan Provoost: Art Historical and Technical Examinations. Thesis/dissertation. 2 vls. Groningen: Rijksuniversiteit, 1993.
 Bruges and the Renaissance: from Memling to Pourbus. Catalogue of exhibition held in 1998 in Bruges, ed. Maximiliaan P.J. Martens. 2 vols. Bruges, 1998

References

External links

Artcyclopedia: Jan Provost (list of works on-line)
Gallery of images

1460s births
1529 deaths
Early Netherlandish painters
People from Mons